= Laura A. Katz =

American biologist

Academic background
- Education: A.B., Harvard College; PhD, 1996, Cornell University
- Thesis: Molecular evolution of phosphoglucose isomerase at two phylogenetic levels (1996)

Laura Aline Katz is an American biologist who is the Elsie Damon Simonds Professor of Biological Sciences at Smith College.

== Early life and education ==
Katz was born to Phyllis Beck Katz and Arnold Martin Katz. She earned her Bachelor of Arts degree from Harvard College and her PhD from Cornell University.

== Career ==
Katz joined the faculty at Smith College in 1997 where she co-founded Smith’s Achieving Excellence in Mathematics, Engineering and Science (AEMES) program. She also established the Katz Laboratory which focuses on "elucidating principles of evolution through reconstruction of evolutionary trees, community sampling of diverse microorganisms from local environments and analyses of genome evolution." Katz also began studying the biodiversity of eukaryotic microbes to find eukaryotic life on earth which cannot be seen by humans.

As an associate professor of biological sciences, Katz was named to the Biodiversity Science and Education Initiative to examine the deteriorating condition of the earth’s biodiversity. She later received a five-year $1.2 million grant to closely examine the evolutionary relationships among 200 eukaryotic microbes. Katz was also appointed one of 11 principal investigators chosen for the Open Tree of Life project, a project aimed at designing a complete online "tree of life" to represent all life forms on Earth and their evolutionary history.

In 2019, Katz was awarded a $443,222 grant from the National Science Foundation for her research project "Collaborative Proposal: Combining single-cell ‘omics’ and community analyses to reveal functional and genetic diversity in marine planktonic ciliates."
